The Kotuykan is a river in Krasnoyarsk Krai, Russia. It is a right hand tributary of the Kotuy.

It freezes up in late September and breaks up in late May or early June.

Course
The Kotuykan has its source in the highest part of the Anabar Plateau. It is a fast-flowing river that flows westwards in a deep valley, often surrounded by picturesque cliffs of marine sediments exposed by erosion that are 1.5 billion years old. 

See also
List of rivers of Russia

References

External links
Fishing helicopter flight from Khatanga to Kotuykan river
Rivers of Krasnoyarsk Krai